Nguyễn Thị Mỹ Liên (born 31 July 1951) is a Vietnamese former swimmer. She competed in the women's 100 metre backstroke at the 1968 Summer Olympics.

References

External links
 

1951 births
Living people
Vietnamese female backstroke swimmers
Olympic swimmers of Vietnam
Swimmers at the 1968 Summer Olympics
Sportspeople from Hanoi
21st-century Vietnamese women